Victor Luiz Prestes Filho (born 5 December 1997), commonly known as Victor Luiz, is a Brazilian footballer who currently plays as a left back for St. Lucia in Malta.

Career statistics

Club

Notes

References

1997 births
Living people
Brazilian footballers
Brazilian expatriate footballers
Association football defenders
Cruzeiro Esporte Clube players
Esporte Clube Democrata players
Londrina Esporte Clube players
Tombense Futebol Clube players
Helsingin Jalkapalloklubi players
Villa Nova Atlético Clube players
St. Lucia F.C. players
Campeonato Brasileiro Série B players
Veikkausliiga players
Maltese Premier League players
Brazilian expatriate sportspeople in Finland
Brazilian expatriate sportspeople in Malta
Expatriate footballers in Finland
Expatriate footballers in Malta
Footballers from Belo Horizonte